is an American linguist who specializes in historical linguistics, particularly the study of Old Japanese and Tangut.

Biography

Miyake was born in Aiea, Hawaii in 1971, and attended Punahou School in Honolulu, graduating in 1989.  He studied Japanese language and literature at University of California, Berkeley, and then studied linguistics at the University of Hawaii at Manoa, from where he obtained his doctorate in 1999, with a dissertation entitled The Phonology of Eighth-Century Japanese Revisited: Another Reconstruction Based upon Written Records. He is best known for his work on the phonetic reconstruction of Old Japanese, but is also known for his work on the extinct Tangut language.

Between 2015 and 2019 Miyake was a research assistant at the British Museum, working on the decipherment of Pyu inscriptions. At the same time he was also a research associate in the Department of Linguistics at the School of Oriental and African Studies.

Works

 Miyake, Marc Hideo (2003). Old Japanese: A Phonetic Reconstruction. London and New York: RoutledgeCurzon. .
 
 Miyake, Marc Hideo (2006). "Kana’s Korean origins". In Françoise Bottéro & Redouane Djamouri (eds.), Ecriture chinoise: données, usages et représentations, pp. 185–205. Paris: CRLAO. .
 Miyake, Marc Hideo (2012). "Complexity from Compression: a Sketch of Pre-Tangut". In Irina Fedorovna Popova (ed.), Тангуты в Центральной Азии: сборник статей в честь 80-летия проф. Е.И.Кычанова [Tanguts in Central Asia: a collection of articles marking the 80th anniversary of Prof. E. I. Kychanov], pp. 244–261.  Moscow: Oriental Literature. .
 Miyake, Marc (2017). “Loanwords, Pre-Qín”, in: Encyclopedia of Chinese Language and Linguistics, Vol 2, Rint Sybesma et al., eds., pp. 650-653. Leiden: Brill. 
 Miyake, Marc (2017). “Loanwords, Post-Qín, Premodern”, in: Encyclopedia of Chinese Language and Linguistics, Vol 2, Rint Sybesma et al., eds., pp. 647-650. Leiden: Brill.

References

External links

 Abode of Amritas (Miyake's linguistics blog)
 Miyake's page at Academia.edu
 
 Miyake's presentation on the A/B distinction in Old Chinese (SOAS, November 2015)
 Miyake's presentation on data management for the decipherment of the Pyu language (SOAS, November 2017)
 Miyake's phonetic database for Tangut (explanation of system of transcription) (version 4.0)

1971 births
Academics of SOAS University of London
American expatriates in the United Kingdom
American Japanologists
Employees of the British Museum
Linguists from the United States
Living people
Punahou School alumni
Tangutologists
University of California, Berkeley alumni
University of Hawaiʻi at Mānoa alumni
Linguists of Pyu (Sino-Tibetan)